WHEM is a Christian radio station licensed to Eau Claire, Wisconsin, broadcasting on 91.3 MHz FM.  The station is owned by Fourth Dimension, Inc.

Translators

References

External links
WHEM's official website

HEM